Florian Howald (born 20 August 1991) is a Swiss orienteering competitor. At the 2016 World Orienteering Championships in Strömstad he won a silver medal in mixed sprint relay with the Swiss team, along with Rahel Friederich, Martin Hubmann and Judith Wyder. 

In the 2017 World Orienteering Championships, Howald won another medal in the Mixed Sprint Relay, this time a Bronze with Elena Roos, Martin Hubmann and Sabine Hauswirth, behind the Danish and Swedish teams.

In the 2016 European Championships in the Czech Republic, Howald achieved a Silver in the Individual Sprint and a surprise gold medal with the second Switzerland team, running with Baptiste Rollier and Martin Hubmann.

References

External links
 
 

1991 births
Living people
Swiss orienteers
Male orienteers
Foot orienteers
World Orienteering Championships medalists
World Games silver medalists
Competitors at the 2017 World Games
World Games medalists in orienteering